Kyurek is a rural locality (a selo) in Kuzhniksky Selsoviet, Tabasaransky District, Republic of Dagestan, Russia. The population was 93 as of 2010.

Geography 
Kyurek is located 14 km west of Khuchni (the district's administrative centre) by road. Churdaf is the nearest rural locality.

References 

Rural localities in Tabasaransky District